Peter M. Nelson (May 16, 1861 – February 10, 1938) was a member of the Wisconsin State Assembly. He was elected to the Assembly in 1908. Additionally, Nelson was Assessor of Coleman, Wisconsin and Chairman (similar to Mayor) and a member of the school board of Beaver, Marinette County, Wisconsin. He was a Republican. Nelson was born on May 16, 1861, in Tromsø, Norway.

He died at his home in Beaver on February 10, 1938.

References

People from Tromsø
Norwegian emigrants to the United States
People from Marinette County, Wisconsin
Mayors of places in Wisconsin
School board members in Wisconsin
Republican Party members of the Wisconsin State Assembly
1861 births
1938 deaths